Squadron Leader X is a 1943 British World War II spy drama directed by Lance Comfort and starring Eric Portman and Ann Dvorak.  The screenplay was adapted by Miles Malleson and Wolfgang Wilhelm from a short story by Emeric Pressburger.

Plot
Erich Kohler (Eric Portman), a crack Luftwaffe pilot who speaks fluent English, is ordered by his superior, Inspector Siegel (Frederick Richter) to drop a "stick" of bombs on the Belgian city of Ghent. He is further instructed to bail out of his aircraft wearing a British RAF uniform, gain the confidence of the local populace and then try to convince them that the British are responsible for the bombing of civilian targets in Belgium.

Despite being able to have a convincing English accent, and equipped with a photograph of his "wife" and a packet of Players cigarettes, the plan goes awry when Kohler falls into the hands of the Belgian Resistance. The resistance members believe they are doing him a favour by arranging for him to be smuggled to Britain among a group of downed RAF bomber crew who are being returned that night.

On arriving in Britain, Kohler escapes and makes his way to London where he tries to get in touch with old contacts, only to find that most have been interned on the Isle of Man. He does manage, however, to contact British nurse Barbara Lucas (Ann Dvorak), an old flame who once had Nazi sympathies, but is not willing to help him. Kohler then takes refuge with the Krohns (Martin Miller and Beatrice Varley), a couple who are reluctant Nazi agents due to threats being made of harm to family members in Germany if they fail to co-operate.

Kohler finds himself being hunted both by the British MI5 and by German officials furious at his bungled mission in Belgium. Dr. Schultz (Henry Oscar), a ruthless Gestapo officer, confronts and accuses Kohler of inefficiency and cowardice. A shoot-out follows and Schultz is killed.

Meanwhile, MI5 agent Inspector Milne (Walter Fitzgerald) picks up Kohler's trail. Kohler manages narrowly to avoid arrest and steals a Supermarine Spitfire fighter aircraft in which to fly back to Germany. Over the English Channel, he is spotted by German fighters who believe they are engaging a British pilot, and shoot the aircraft down.

Cast
 Eric Portman as Erich Kohler
 Ann Dvorak as Barbara Lucas
 Walter Fitzgerald as Inspector Milne
 Martin Miller as Mr. Krohn
 Beatrice Varley as Mrs. Krohn
 Henry Oscar as Dr. Schultz
 Barry Jones as Bruce Fenwick
 Charles Victor as Marks
 Marjorie Rhodes as Mrs. Agnew
 David Peel as Michael Bertholt
 Aubrey Mallalieu as Pierre
 Mary Merrall as Miss Thorndike
 Carl Jaffe as Luftwaffe Colonel
 Frederick Richter as Inspector Siegel

Production
Squadron Leader X featured a Supermarine Spitfire fighter aircraft and a Klemm Kl 25 light aircraft. In a contemporary review, The Cinema declared: "The air-sequences, made with official Air Ministry co-operation, are among the most actionful and breath-taking ever screened".

Reception
Squadron Leader X was exceptionally well received by some critics on its release, with  Lionel Collier in his review for the Picturegoer, named it, "one of the best spy melodramas yet made".  The Monthly Film Bulletin spoke of "a cast that is of the highest order" and summarised the film as "an exciting story, well scripted and produced with tremendous attention to detail".

Film historian Bertil Skogsberg in Wings on the Screen: A Pictorial History of Air Movies (1987) called some sequences "fairly exciting but otherwise (an) uninteresting thriller."  Aviation film historian James H. Farmer in Celluloid Wings: The Impact of Movies on Aviation (1984) had a similar appraisal, that, Squadron Leader X was "overlong".

Preservation status
There is no record of Squadron Leader X ever being re-shown after its original release. The British Film Institute has been unable to trace a print for inclusion in the BFI National Archive, and currently classes the film as "missing, believed lost". Squadron Leader X is included on the BFI's "75 Most Wanted" list of missing British feature films. Film historians in the 21st century have also evinced a major increase in interest in Comfort's directorial career and Squadron Leader X is a vital missing piece of his filmography.

See also
List of lost films

References

Notes

Citations

Bibliography

 Farmer, James H. Celluloid Wings: The Impact of Movies on Aviation. Blue Ridge Summit, Pennsylvania: Tab Books Inc., 1984. .
 Pendo, Stephen. Aviation in the Cinema. Lanham, Maryland: Scarecrow Press, 1985. .
 Skogsberg, Bertil. Wings on the Screen: A Pictorial History of Air Movies. London: Tantivy Press, 1987. .

External links
 British Film Institute 75 Most Wanted entry, with extensive notes
 
 

1943 films
1940s war films
British war films
British spy films
British aviation films
World War II films made in wartime
British black-and-white films
Belgium in fiction
Films set in Belgium
Films directed by Lance Comfort
Lost British films
Films scored by William Alwyn
1940s lost films
1940s spy films
Films about the Belgian Resistance
1940s English-language films
1940s British films